Atelopus varius, the Costa Rican variable harlequin toad or clown frog, is a small Neotropical true toad from the family Bufonidae (Crump 1986). Once ranging from Costa Rica to Panama, A. varius is now listed as critically endangered and has been reduced to a single remnant population near Quepos, Costa Rica (rediscovered in 2003) and has only relict populations in western Panama (IUCN). Recent variation in air temperature, precipitation, stream flow patterns, and the subsequent spread of a pathogenic chytrid fungus (Batrachochytrium dendrobatidis) linked to global climate change have been the leading cause of decline for A. varius (Lips et al. 2003 and Pounds et al. 2006). A. zeteki has been considered a subspecies of A. varius, but is now generally considered a separate species (Savage, 2002).

Geographic range 

The historic range of A. varius stretched from the Pacific and Atlantic slopes of the Cordilleras de Tilaran mountain range in Costa Rica into western Panama. Suitable habitat includes both pre-montane and lower-montane zones as well as some lowland sites along rocky streams in hilly areas (ranging from 6 to 2000m in elevation) (Savage 1972).

Habitat and ecology 

A. varius is a diurnal frog often found on rocks or in crevices along streams in humid lowland and montane forests (Crump and Pounds 1985). It is primarily a terrestrial species, only entering the water during breeding season, relying on spray from streams for moisture (Pounds and Crump 1994).

The Costa Rican variable harlequin frog is slow moving and often remains in the same area for long periods of time. The conspicuous or aposematic coloration of A. varius likely serves as a warning to potential predators of the toxicity of the frog's integument which contains tetrodotoxin, a potent neurotoxin (Crump and Pounds 1985).  Its main food source is small arthropods that are most abundant during the dry season (Crump 1988).
The only known predator of A. varius is a parasitic sarcophagid fly (Notochaeta bufonivora) which deposits its larvae on the surface of the frog's thigh. The larvae then proceed to burrow inside the frog and eat it from within (Pounds and Crump 1987).

Conservation status 

In recent decades, A. varius has become increasingly rare throughout its geographic range. The first incidence of its disappearance was recorded after a census conducted between 1990 and 1992 near Monteverde, Costa Rica revealed zero individuals where its population had previously peaked at 751 adults (Crump and Pounds 1985 and Pounds and Crump 1994). By 1996, A. varius was believed to be extinct throughout Costa Rica, however, in a 2019 assessment, two subpopulations were discovered in the country. In Panama, mass mortality has drastically reduced populations of A. varius in recent years and it was believed to be locally extinct (Lips 1999), however the species was recorded again in the 2019 assessment.

Several theories related to changes in climatic patterns have been put forth to account for the rapid decline of A. varius. A trend toward rising temperatures across the tropics in the late 1980s and early 1990s has been implicated in the declines of multiple lizard and amphibian species including several Atelopus spp. (Pounds et al. 1999). More recently, an observed global decline in amphibian species richness has been linked to an outbreak of the pathogenic chytrid fungus Batrachochytrium dendrobatidis (Pounds et al. 2006). This pathogen can be transmitted between individuals through shed skin cells and is known to infect keratinized body surfaces where it can impair cutaneous respiration and osmoregulation thus resulting in mortality (Pounds et al. 2006). Current attempts to preserve A. varius include a recently initiated captive breeding program as well as continued efforts to protect vital forest habitat (IUCN). In March 2021, it was announced that the species had been successfully bred in captivity outside of Panama for the first time.

References 

Crump, M.L. 1986. Homing and site fidelity in a Neotropical frog, Atelopus varius (Bufonidae). Copeia 1986(4): 1007-1009.
Crump, M.L. 1988. "Aggression in harlequin frogs: male-male competition and a possible conflict of interest between the sexes." Animal Behaviour 36(4): 1064-1077.
Crump, M.L., and J.A. Pounds 1985. "Lethal Parasitism of an Aposematic Anuran (Atelopus varius) by Notochaeta bufonivora (Diptera: Sarcophagidae)." Journal of Parasitology 71(5), 588-591.
Lips, K.R. 1999. Mass mortality and population declines of anurans at an upland site in western Panama. Conservation Biology 13: 117-125.
Lips, K.R., Green, D.E. and Papendick, R. 2003. Chytridiomycosis in wild frogs from southern Costa Rica. Journal of Herpetology 37: 215-218.
Pounds, J.A., Bustamante, M.R., Coloma, L.A., Consuegra, J.A., Fogden, M.P.L., Foster, P.N., La Marca, E., Masters, K.L., Merino-Viteri, A., Puschendorf, R., Ron, S.R., Sánchez-Azofeifa, G.A., Still, C.J. and Young, B.E. 2006. Widespread amphibian extinctions from epidemic disease driven by global warming. Nature 439: 161-167.
Pounds, J.A., and Crump, M.L.  1987. "Harlequin Frogs Along a Tropical Montane Stream: Aggregation and the Risk of Predation by Frog-Eating Flies." Biotropica 19(4): 306-309.
Pounds, J.A. and Crump, M.L. 1994. Amphibian declines and climate disturbance: The case of the golden toad and the harlequin frog. Conservation Biology 8: 72-85.
Pounds, J.A., Fogden, M.P.L., and J.H. Campbell 1999. "Biological response to climate change on a tropical mountain." Nature 398(6728): 611-615.
Savage, J.M. 1972. The harlequin frogs, genus Atelopus, of Costa Rica, and western Panama. Herpetologica 28: 77-94.
Savage, J.M. 2002. The Amphibians and Reptiles of Costa Rica. University of Chicago Press, Chicago.

External links

IUCN Red List of All Threatened Species
The Rainmaker Project
Atelopus.com - Fighting to survive

varius
Amphibians of Costa Rica
Endemic fauna of Costa Rica
Amphibians described in 1856
Taxa named by Eduard von Martens
Taxa named by Hinrich Lichtenstein
Critically endangered fauna of North America